Jean-Claude Fignolé (May 24, 1941 – July 11, 2017) was a Haitian author.

References

1941 births
2017 deaths
Haitian male writers
People from Jérémie